The Sim Smith Covered Bridge is east of Montezuma, Indiana. The single span Burr Truss covered bridge structure was built by Joseph A. Britton in 1883.

It was added to the National Register of Historic Places in 1978.

Gallery

See also
 List of Registered Historic Places in Indiana
 Parke County Covered Bridges
 Parke County Covered Bridge Festival

References

External links

Covered bridges on the National Register of Historic Places in Parke County, Indiana
Bridges completed in 1883
King post truss bridges in the United States
Wooden bridges in Indiana
Burr Truss bridges in the United States
1883 establishments in Indiana